Downtown is a relatively new neighborhood in Alexandria, Egypt. It is home to several malls, shops and restaurants.

See also

 Neighborhoods in Alexandria

Neighbourhoods of Alexandria